Estelline can refer to:

 Estelline, South Dakota
 Estelline, Texas